Carl James Larpenter (July 1, 1936 – September 15, 1998) was a professional American football player for the American Football League's Denver Broncos (1960–1961) and Dallas Texans (1962). He was born in Port Arthur, Texas and attended the University of Texas. He was an offensive tackle and an offensive guard.

See also
Other American Football League players

External links
Stats

References

1936 births
1998 deaths
Sportspeople from Port Arthur, Texas
Players of American football from Texas
American football offensive tackles
American football offensive guards
Texas Longhorns football players
Denver Broncos (AFL) players
Dallas Texans (AFL) players